Cynthia Karen Loving (born November 19, 1978), known professionally as Lil' Mo, is an American singer, songwriter, rapper, television and radio personality. She is best known for her 2001 single "Superwoman Pt. II", featuring then-unknown rapper Fabolous, which has been credited as launching his career. She first gained recognition as Missy Elliott's protégé, having been featured on her record-breaking hit single "Hot Boyz", as well as through her collaborations with Ja Rule, with whom she penned the Grammy-nominated "Put It on Me" and "I Cry".

Early life
Mo was born into a military family. Her father, Bishop Jacob D. Loving, and her mother, First-Lady Cynthia Loving Sr., raised her primarily in Long Island, New York, but moved regularly due to her father's military assignments. The family lived in Texas, Georgia and North Carolina before settling in Baltimore, Maryland. As an adult, Mo moved to New York City's Manhattan borough to pursue her music career.

Career

Beginnings (1996–2000)
Mo began her career as a backing vocalist, session musician and songwriter. In early 1998, while submitting demo material to Elektra Records for Nicole Wray's 1998 debut album, Make It Hot, Mo caught the attention of Missy Elliott, who helped land her a contract deal with Elektra. On June 29, 1998, Mo released her debut single "5 Minutes" from the soundtrack for the Frankie Lymon biographical film Why Do Fools Fall in Love. The song was planned to appear on Mo's debut album, however when it underperformed in the US, it was pulled from the final track listing. Mo's debut album was originally set to be released in March 1999, however, it was pushed back multiple times during Elektra's attempts to revamp Mo's image and sound.

Mo gained further exposure during this time for her features on Ol' Dirty Bastard's cover of Billie Holiday's "Good Morning Heartache", Missy Elliott's record-breaking single "Hot Boyz", which spent 18 weeks at number one on the Hot Rap Singles from December 4, 1999 to March 25, 2000, and Ja Rule's single "Put It on Me", which was a hit on both urban and pop radio, and reached number eight on the US pop charts. More collaborations by Ja Rule and Lil' Mo followed, including "I Cry", which repurposed The O'Jays' 1978 hit "Cry Together".

Breakthrough, Based on a True Story (2001)
On April 10, 2000, Mo released "Ta Da", her first solo single. After years of successful collaborations and features, Mo would finally release a successful hit of her own, "Superwoman Pt. II", her second single from her upcoming album. The single was released on March 6, 2001 and peaked at No. 11 on the Billboard Hot 100, helping bring then-underground rapper Fabolous to mainstream attention. On June 26, 2001, Mo's debut album, Based on a True Story was released to generally favorable reviews. The album peaked at No. 14 on the Billboard 200 and attained a gold certification from the RIAA, making it Mo's successful album to date. In August 2001, Mo released the follow-up single "Gangsta (Love 4 the Streets)", however, it failed to match the success of its predecessor.

Meet the Girl Next Door, career struggles (2002–05)
While recovering from being assaulted with a champagne bottle after a performance in San Francisco, Mo began her radio career, working as a part-time anchor for Baltimore urban radio station WERQ-FM. That same year, Mo began preparations for her second album, Meet the Girl Next Door. The album was released on April 29, 2003, preceded by the singles "4Ever" and "Ten Commandments". While Mo promoted the singles on shows such as Jimmy Kimmel Live! and Soul Train, she would later criticise Elektra for their lack of support and minimal promotion for the album, which she attributed to being pregnant at the time.

Mo's contract with Elektra expired as the label was absorbed by Atlantic Records, and in July 2004, she signed Universal's Cash Money Records to record her third album, then titled Syndicated: the Lil' Mo Hour. The album was scheduled for an early 2005 release, before being pushed back to October, after its four singles (including "Hot Girls" and "Dem Boyz") failed to create any buzz. Following the destruction of Cash Money's New Orleans studio by Hurricane Katrina, Mo was dropped from the Cash Money roster and Syndicated was shelved.

Independent releases, Pain and Paper, P.S. I Love Me (2006–12)
Mo began releasing singles as an independent artist under her production company HoneyChild Entertainment, which was first founded by Mo in 2000. On August 28, 2007, Mo released the album Pain & Paper, distributed by Koch Entertainment and DrakeWeb Music Group and selling only 6000 copies. Its singles, "Sumtimes I", featuring Jim Jones, and "Lucky Her" failed to chart.

In 2008, Mo signed a two-album deal with Global Music Group and began work her fourth album, tentatively titled Tattoos & Roses: The Rebellion Against My Pain. The album was initially planned to include a second disc featuring Mo's live performances, however this was eventually scrapped. On May 8, 2011, Mo released the mixtape P.S. I Love You. On November 1, 2011, Mo released P.S. I Love Me in conjunction with Bronx Bridge Entertainment and distributed by Fontana Distribution. The album was preceded by the singles "On the Floor", "I Love Me", featuring Tweet, and "Take Me Away", featuring Maino.

Television career, The Scarlet Letter, retirement (2013–present)
In 2013, Mo became a cast member of the reality television series R&B Divas: Los Angeles, which premiered on TV One on July 10, 2013. The season's reunion special garnered a total of 834,000 viewers, tying with the debut of the sitcom The Rickey Smiley Show as the network's No. 1 telecast among adults 25–54 in TV One history. On September 10, 2013, Lil' Mo released the song "I'm a Diva" via iTunes. Another non-album single, "L's Up", was released the following week.

On October 28, 2014, Mo released her fifth album, The Scarlet Letter, under Penalthy Entertainment. The album was preceded by the single "Should've Never Let You Go", as well as her second mixtape No Shit Sherlock, which featured contributions by Da Brat and songwriter Tiyon "TC" Mack. On April 29, 2015, R&B Divas: Los Angeles ended after its third season.

In January 2016, Mo began hosting the WKYS radio show The Fam in the Morning with DJ Quick Silva. She was fired from the show in February 2017. Later that year, Mo joined the cast of VH1's Love & Hip Hop: New York and appeared in an episode of Couples Court with the Cutlers. She would also appear in We TV's Marriage Boot Camp: Reality Stars 12 — Hip Hop Edition.

On October 25, 2018, Mo announced her retirement from the music industry to pursue a career in law.

Personal life

Assault
On June 22, 2001, while being escorted to a limousine, Lil' Mo was assaulted by a male at a San Francisco concert venue. She was bludgeoned in the head by the man's champagne bottle and was immediately hospitalized at California Pacific Medical Center, where she received 20 stitches. The incident traumatized Mo and left her suspicious of the attack, in which she felt it may have been a potential "set up". Mo confirmed to MTV News that she had to cancel many shows and cease a double-music video shoot for her single "Gangsta" so she could recover from the incident. A reward ranging from $1,000 to $5,000 was issued in hopes of catching the assailant. Though the alleged male attacker was never found, local San Francisco police received anonymous tips that the attacker boasted about his actions at a Hunters Point housing project near San Francisco, California.

Marriages and children
In 2001, Mo met her first husband, Augustus "Gus" Stone, at a Washington, D.C. gas station. After dating for five months, they wed on August 29, 2001. On August 19, 2002, Mo gave birth to her first child, Heaven Love'on Stone. On February 24, 2005, Mo gave birth to the couple's second child, God'Iss Love Stone. In December 2005, she filed for divorce. Their divorce was finalized in August 2007. Through the marriage, she became the stepmother to his son, Jerez Coleman, who in June 2014 appeared as "Kidd Cole" on an episode of MTV's television series Catfish: The TV Show.

On June 22, 2008, Mo married Gospel recording artist Phillip Bryant. On January 16, 2009, Mo gave birth to her third child, Justin McKenzie Phillip Bryant. On July 10, 2012, Mo gave birth to her fourth child, Jonah Maddox-Phillip Bryant. The couple separated due to his infidelity and officially divorced on September 15, 2014.

On October 1, 2014, Mo married professional boxer Karl Dargan. On August 28, 2015, Mo gave birth to Karl Sharif Dargan Jr., her fifth child and Karl's third. In 2018, at the reunion special of Love & Hip Hop: New York, Mo announced that she was expecting her sixth child. Mo admitted on social media that she had suffered a miscarriage a month before the reunion aired. In May 2019, Mo announced that she had left Karl, after he had spat on her in front of their children during an argument. Mo revealed in later interviews that he had been physically abusive throughout their marriage.

Personal struggles
In 2003, Mo revealed to Vibe magazine that she struggled with an eating disorder since 2000.

In 2019, Mo revealed that she had struggled with an opioid addiction.

Religion
Mo was raised in a Christian household, her parents are Holiness preachers. In a 2017 episode of Love & Hip Hop: New York, Mo revealed that she had converted to Islam three years prior as a result of her marriage to Karl, and is seen praying in hijab.

Feuds

Ja Rule
A feud between Mo and former collaborator Ja Rule embroiled in late 2001, when Murder Inc. began favoring Ashanti over her. In January 2003, while co-hosting 106 & Park: Prime, Mo sent a shout-out to 50 Cent, just seconds after she premiered a Ja Rule video. The incident angered Ja Rule and Murder Inc. Mo had told the press she assumed BET was going to edit out the shout, and did not think the gesture would cause an uproar. Ja Rule released the diss track "Loose Change," which targeted Eminem, 50 Cent, Dr. Dre, Chris Lighty and Lil' Mo. Rule credited himself as the reason why she had any hits. In May 2003, Mo released a freestyle diss to Ja Rule.

In April 2003, controversy arose regarding payment for Lil' Mo's contributions on "I Cry" and "Put It on Me". In 2005, Lil' Mo filed a lawsuit against Ja Rule, Murder Inc. and Def Jam for over $15 million. In 2010, the two reconciled, and the next year, recorded a track together titled "U & Me".

Keyshia Cole
The feud between Lil' Mo and R&B singer Keyshia Cole originated in August 2005 via the radio series Star and Buc Wild Morning Show. Mo was reported to have dismissed the vocal talent of a new crop of R&B performers, saying that they relied on dancing. Cole took offense and went to Dream Hotel in New York City, where she encountered Lil' Mo's manager Phil Thornton and a stylist, allegedly stating "You all are traitors. [Lil' Mo] is the enemy.". Lil' Mo shrugged off the incident, saying she was told that Cole was intoxicated at the time, which Cole denied.

In March 2013, Cole was criticized by urban media outlets for her Twitter critique of Beyoncé's "Bow Down/I Been On". This led to Mo and Cole exchanging hostile tweets over the next few days. Despite the exchanges, in May 2013, Mo said there was no beef between her and Cole, which led to the two exchanging hostile messages again via Instagram and Twitter.

Discography

Studio albums
Based on a True Story (2001)
Meet the Girl Next Door (2003)
Pain & Paper (2007)
P.S. I Love Me (2011)
The Scarlet Letter (2014)

Tours
Lilith Fair (with Missy Elliott) (1998) 
Missy Elliott: Live in Hamburg/Germany (1998–1999)
Sprite Simon Dtour Live (with 3LW) (2003)
Rock the Mic Tour (with Jay-Z and 50 Cent) (2003) 
Seagram's Gin Live Tour (with Xscape) (2005)

Filmography

Television

Awards and nominations

References

External links

 

1978 births
Living people
21st-century American singers
20th-century American singers
20th-century African-American women singers
African-American women singer-songwriters
American contemporary R&B singers
Cash Money Records artists
American hip hop singers
Musicians from Baltimore
People from Long Island
Singers from New York City
American women hip hop musicians
People from Odenton, Maryland
Singer-songwriters from Maryland
20th-century American women singers
21st-century American women singers
East West Records artists
Elektra Records artists
21st-century African-American women singers
Singer-songwriters from New York (state)